The Santo Domingo River (Chiapas) is a river of Mexico.

See also
List of rivers of Mexico

References
Atlas of Mexico, 1975 map image.
The Prentice Hall American World Atlas, 1984.
Rand McNally, The New International Atlas, 1993.

Rivers of Chiapas